WWNB (1490 AM) is a radio station broadcasting a sports format and affiliated to ESPN Radio. Licensed to New Bern, North Carolina, United States.  The station is currently owned by CTC Media Group. WWNB used to simulcast on WAVQ/1400 in Jacksonville, North Carolina.  That simulcast ended in December 2012 after WAVQ was sold.

WWNB is the southernmost affiliate of the Washington Nationals Radio Network.

References

External links

WNB
New Bern, North Carolina